Fuchsia lehmannii is a species of plant in the family Onagraceae. It is endemic to Ecuador.

References

Endemic flora of Ecuador
lehmannii
Near threatened plants
Taxonomy articles created by Polbot